During the 1999–2000 season, West Ham United competed in the Premier League.

Season summary
West Ham's involvement in the Intertoto Cup meant that they would have their shortest close-season in history. Only 62 days had passed since the last game of the previous season before West Ham took to the field against Jokerit of Finland.

West Ham had already played four games before the Premier League season began, and this match-fitness head-start on the rest of the division would see them in third place after five games.

Although they lost in the first leg of the Intertoto Cup Final 1–0 at home to Metz, West Ham managed to win the return leg 3–1 two weeks later and ensure UEFA Cup football.

Harry Redknapp regarded this result as his greatest night as West Ham's manager: "That was a great performance and a great day for West Ham, to win the Intertoto Cup and to be in the UEFA Cup and turning in such an outstanding performance against a good French team, to go over there and play so well and win 3–1. We took great support over to France and they enjoyed their day. Yeah, I think that was special. That was a real good day for me and West Ham's history."

Frank Lampard was West Ham's top European goalscorer with four in ten games. He was ever-present in West Ham's European campaign, along with Trevor Sinclair, Paolo Di Canio and captain Steve Lomas.

After making only one substitute appearance in West Ham's first Intertoto Cup game, Ian Wright was loaned to Nottingham Forest. Later in the season he signed a permanent deal at Celtic.

On 15 December 1999, West Ham played a League Cup quarter-final game against Aston Villa. The game went to extra time and a reserve player, Emmanuel Omoyinmi, was brought on as a substitute for Paulo Wanchope in the 113th minute. Unknown to Redknapp, Omoyinmi had previously played in the competition for Gillingham, where he had spent time on loan earlier in the season, and was thus ineligible to play. Although the Hammers won the game on penalties, the game was replayed after the Football League upheld a complaint by Villa. West Ham lost the replay 3–1. The error eventually led to the resignations of the club secretary Graham Mackrell and the football secretary Alison Dowd: "Whatever happens, I'm responsible for administration here at West Ham United. The buck does stop with me," said Mackrell.

26 March 2000 saw West Ham meet Wimbledon. The Hammers had only beaten the Dons at home twice in the previous ten meetings between the clubs. The 9th minute of the game saw Di Canio score what would become the BBC's "Goal of the Season" with an airborne volley. Frédéric Kanouté doubled West Ham's lead in the 59th minute, before Wimbledon pulled one back after 75 minutes with a 25-yard volley from former Hammer Michael Hughes.

West Ham's heaviest defeat of the season came on 1 April when they were demolished by table-toppers and eventual champions Manchester United. Wanchope opened the scoring in the 11th minute but Manchester United proceeded to score seven, including a Paul Scholes hat-trick.

This sparked West Ham into a run of three straight wins, culminating with their biggest win of the season on 22 April, when they beat Coventry City 5–0. Di Canio scored in the 48th and 67th minutes, with the other goals coming from Michael Carrick, Javier Margas and Kanouté.

The Boleyn Ground saw its largest attendance of the season (26,044) on the last day against Leeds United. The game ended 0–0, and West Ham finished 9th in the Premier League, putting them in the top nine for the third consecutive season. Redknapp said after the Leeds game: "It's been a good season again. People don't realise that West Ham have only finished in the top ten 14 times in its entire history and this is only the second time that we've done it three years running."

Di Canio was the season's leading scorer with 17 goals in all competitions. Sinclair made the most appearances with 49 in all competitions.

Final league table

Results summary

Results
West Ham United's score comes first

Legend

FA Premier League

FA Cup

League Cup

NOTE: This match was a replay after West Ham were ordered to replay the match after fielding an ineligible player in the original tie

Intertoto Cup

UEFA Cup

First-team squad
Squad at end of season

Left club during season

Reserve squad
The following players did not make a first-team appearance this season.

Statistics

Starting 11
Considering starts in all competitions

Transfers
Signings for the 1999-2000 season included full-backs Gary Charles, for £1.2 million from Benfica, and 37-year-old former England International Stuart Pearce, who signed from Newcastle United on a free transfer. Also arriving was Croatian Igor Štimac, for £600,000, who followed his Derby County teammate Paulo Wanchope to Upton Park. West Ham had already spent £3.5 million the previous month to bring in the lanky Costa Rican.

All of these transfers had been funded by the £5.75 million sale of Eyal Berkovic to Celtic, and Stan Lazaridis' £1.9 million departure to Birmingham City. West Ham had only spent £300,000 for Lazaridis four years earlier.

Harry Redknapp had tried to bring Slaven Bilić back from Everton but the player failed a medical.

In
  Gary Charles -  Benfica, £1,200,000
  Stuart Pearce -  Newcastle United, free
  Igor Štimac -  Derby County, £600,000
  Paulo Wanchope -  Derby County, £3,500,000

Out
  Eyal Berkovic -  Celtic, £5,750,000
  Stan Lazaridis -  Birmingham City, £1,900,000

References

West Ham United F.C. seasons
West Ham United
West Ham United
West Ham United